Ectadia is a genus of Asian bush crickets of the tribe Elimaeini (subfamily Phaneropterinae).  Records are primarily from southern China and Indochina.

Species
The Orthoptera Species File lists the following species:
 Ectadia angusta Gorochov, 2009
 Ectadia apicalis Liu, Kang & Liu, 2004
 Ectadia diuturna Heller & Liu, 2017
 Ectadia fulva Brunner von Wattenwyl, 1893
 Ectadia mistshenkoi Gorochov, 2009
 Ectadia obsolescens Liu, Kang & Liu, 2004
 Ectadia pilosa Brunner von Wattenwyl, 1878 – type species
 Ectadia sinuata Liu, Kang & Liu, 2004
 Ectadia sulcata Xia & Liu, 1990

References

External links
 Catalogue of Life link
 Kim T, Pham HT (2014) Checklist of Vietnamese Orthoptera Saltatoria Zootaxa 3811 (1): 53–82.

Tettigoniidae genera
Phaneropterinae
Insects of Asia
Orthoptera of Indo-China